St. Paul is the name of some places in the U.S. state of Texas:
St. Paul, Collin County, Texas
St. Paul, Falls County, Texas
St. Paul, San Patricio County, Texas